Lupin the 3rd Part V: Misadventures in France, also known simply as , is an anime television series in the Lupin the Third franchise, produced at Telecom Animation Film and directed by Yūichirō Yano and written by Ichirō Ōkouchi. It is the sixth anime adaptation of the Lupin III series created by Monkey Punch. The series aired from April 4 to September 18, 2018, on Japanese television, and was simulcast with English subtitles by Crunchyroll.

Part V was produced at Telecom Animation Film, and was directed by Yūichirō Yano, reprising his role from 2015's Part IV. It was written by Ichirō Ōkouchi alongside Gō Zappa, Daisuke Sakō, Kazushige Nojima, Takahiro Okura, Yuniko Ayana, Keiichi Sigsawa and Shatner Nishida, and featured character designs by Hisao Yokobori. The series was announced at Japan Expo in Paris in 2017, and aired for 24 episodes from April 4, 2018 to September 18, 2018 on NTV, NTV+, KNB, STV, CTV, FBS, SDT, YTV, TSB, and NKT. It is also streamed by Hulu in Japan, and simulcast by Crunchyroll in Japanese with English subtitles. It will be released on home video in the United Kingdom and Ireland by Anime Limited. In the United States, Adult Swim's Toonami programming block premiered the series on June 16, 2019.

The first Japanese DVD/Blu-ray set containing the first five episodes of the anime was released on July 25, 2018. It includes a memorial OVA episode titled "Is Lupin Still Burning?" to celebrate the 50th anniversary of the manga. The episode was directed by Jun Kawagoe, with Monkey Punch as general director and character designs by Hisao Horikoshi and Satoshi Hirayama. Its title is a reference to the debut episode of the first Lupin the Third anime series and effectively acts as a remake, but features other enemies such as Kyosuke Mamo, Sandayu Momochi, Pycal, and Stoneman.


Episode list

Home media release

Japanese

English

See also

 Lupin III
 List of Lupin the Third Part I episodes
 List of Lupin III Part II episodes
 List of Lupin III Part III episodes
 List of Lupin the Third: The Woman Called Fujiko Mine episodes
 List of Lupin the 3rd Part IV: The Italian Adventure episodes
 List of Lupin the 3rd Part 6 episodes
 List of Lupin III television specials

Notes

References

External links
  
 
 

Lupin the 3rd Part V: Misadventures in France
Lupin the 3rd Part V: Misadventures in France